The 1971 European 10 m Events Championships was the 1st edition of the special 10 m events competition, European 10 m Events Championships, organised by the International Shooting Sport Federation.

Results

Men

Women

Medal table

See also
 European Shooting Confederation
 International Shooting Sport Federation
 List of medalists at the European Shooting Championships
 List of medalists at the European Shotgun Championships

References

External links
 
 European Champion Archive Results at Sport-komplett-de

European Shotgun Championships
European 10 m Events Championships